Pata Pata is a 1967 album by Miriam Makeba. The album charted at number 74 in the US albums chart. Most of the recordings were new, though Sivuca's "Maria Fulo" was included again, from the previous album All About Miriam.

Track listing
"Pata Pata" – single
"Ha Po Zamani"	
"What is Love" – single	
"Maria Fulo"	
"Yetentu Tizaleny"	
"Click Song Number One"	
"Ring Bell, Ring Bell"	
"Jol'inkomo"	
"West Wind"	
"Saduva"	
"A Piece of Ground"

References

1967 albums
Miriam Makeba albums
Albums produced by Jerry Ragovoy
Reprise Records albums